The Azerbaijan Cup 1992 was the first season of what would become the annual cup competition in Azerbaijan.

First round

Quarterfinals
The four winners from the First Round were joined by four other teams.

Semifinals
The four quarterfinal winners were drawn into two single-legged semifinal ties.

Final

References

External links
Azerbaijan Cup
Azerbaijan Cup '92 RSSSF

Azerbaijan Cup seasons
Azerbaijan Cup
Cup
Cup